The Custer County Courthouse in Callaway, Nebraska was listed on the National Register of Historic Places as First Custer County Courthouse in 1990.

It was built in 1876.

It was moved to its current location in 1933.

It is located at Pacific St. and Cameron Ave. in Callaway.

References

External links

Courthouses in Nebraska	
National Register of Historic Places in Custer County, Nebraska
Buildings and structures completed in 1876